Mustafa Rüştü Erdelhun (1894  9 November 1983) was a Turkish general who served as the 10th chief of the Turkish General Staff in the Turkish Armed Forces from 23 August 1958 to 27 May 1960, and the 9th commander of the Turkish Land Forces from 1 August 1958 to 21 August 1958. He also served as commander of the 18th Corps and the Second Army.

He was promoted to the rank of brigadier general in 1945, major general in 1947, lieutenant general in 1952, and general in 1956.

Biography 
A graduate of the Turkish Military Academy in 1914 and as a staff officer in 1926, he was born in Edirne while his parents were born in Romania. They later migrated to Thrace. Prior to serving as a team commander in Artillery and Adjutant units, he went to Anatolia in 1921 where he formally joined the Turkish Army with the Izmir Weapons Commission.

He took several assignments during his career, including chief of staff of the Guard Company Command's 8th Division, faculty member of Turkish War Academies, battalion commander in the 61st and 121st field artillery regiment. He also commanded branch office at the General Staff headquarters.

He was later transferred to Tokyo where he represented the country as a military attaché and with the second appointment in London. He was also appointed as a deputy commander of the 43rd Field Artillery Regiment stationed in Rome.

As a brigadier general he commanded the 15th Brigade and the Training department of Chief of General Staff. As a major general he commanded the 6th and 51st Division Command and became a member of the MSB Istanbul Investigation Board. As a lieutenant general he was appointed as the head of Tokyo Liaison Committee, in addition to commanding the 18th Corps.

Erdelhun participated in the First World War and the Turkish War of Independence.

Awards and decorations

References

Further reading 
 

1894 births
1983 deaths
Chiefs of the Turkish General Staff
Commanders of the Turkish Land Forces
Turkish military personnel of the Turkish War of Independence
Recipients of the Medal of Independence (Turkey)
Recipients of the Turkish Armed Forces Medal of Honor
Recipients of the Legion of Merit
Recipients of the Order of the Medjidie
Recipients of the Iron Cross (1939)
Recipients of the Order of Military Merit (Korea)
Turkish Military Academy alumni
People from Edirne